Ana María Llona Málaga (born 1936 in Lima, Perú) is a Peruvian poet. She published her first book of poetry, Animal tan Albo, in 2009. She is currently working on her second book.

Bibliography 

 Animal tan Albo (Lima, 2009),

References 

Peruvian women poets
Writers from Lima
1936 births
Living people
21st-century Peruvian poets
21st-century Peruvian women writers